Andraž Žurej (born 17 May 1993) is a Slovenian football forward who plays for SC St. Stefan.

External links
 NZS profile 
 

1993 births
Living people
Slovenian footballers
Association football forwards
NK Celje players
SK Austria Klagenfurt players
Slovenian PrvaLiga players
Slovenian Second League players
Slovenian expatriate footballers
Expatriate footballers in Austria
Slovenian expatriate sportspeople in Austria
Slovenia youth international footballers
Slovenia under-21 international footballers